Soleil is the French word for the Sun.

Soleil may also refer to:

In music:
 Soleil (Françoise Hardy album), a 1970 album by Françoise Hardy
 Soleil (Jean-Pierre Ferland album), a 1971 album
 Soleil (Watanabe Misato album), a 2002 album by female Japanese pop artist Watanabe Misato
 "Soleil", a 1984 song by Dalida

Other uses
 Soleil (name), a surname and given name
 Mont Soleil, a mountain in the Canton of Bern, Switzerland
 Cité Soleil (Sun City), an extremely impoverished and densely populated commune in the Port-au-Prince metropolitan area in Haiti
 Le Soleil, a list of newspapers
 Soleil (film), a 1997 French film by Roger Hanin
 Soleil (Brisbane), a skyscraper in Brisbane, Australia
 Soleil FC, a football club based in Cotonou, Benin
 Soleil Productions, a French comic book publisher
 SOLEIL, a synchrotron in France
 The European title for the Sega Mega Drive game Crusader of Centy
 Soleil (company), a Japanese video game developer known for developing Ninjala
 Soliel, a brand of sparkling water produced and sold by Albertsons

See also
 Cirque du Soleil, an international circus organization based in Montreal, Canada